Leka, Crown Prince of Albania (also known as King Leka I; 5 April 193930 November 2011), was the only son of King Zog I and Queen Geraldine of Albania. He was called Crown Prince Skander at birth. Leka was the pretender to the Albanian throne and was referred to as King Leka I.

Biography

Early life and education

Leka was born on April 5, 1939, in the Royal Palace of Tirana in the Kingdom of Albania. He was named Crown Prince Skander and his birth was celebrated with a 101-gun salute and a military parade. Leka was the son of King Zog I of Albania and Queen Geraldine of Albania; and was also an eighth cousin of U.S. President Richard Nixon through his maternal grandmother, a New York socialite.

Just two days after his birth, King Zog I was forced into exile after Benito Mussolini's army invaded the country during the Italian invasion of Albania. Shortly after, Zog was replaced on the throne of Albania by Victor Emmanuel III of Italy — an action the King of Italy would later plead personal forgiveness for. Victor Emmanuel III remained King until his abdication in 1943, following the Armistice of Cassibile.

Crown Prince Leka began life in exile in various countries. After traveling across Europe, the Albanian Royal Family settled in England, first at the Ritz Hotel in London, then moving for a very short period in 1941 to South Ascot, near Ascot in Berkshire, and then in 1941 to Parmoor House, Parmoor, near Frieth in Buckinghamshire.

After the war, Zog, Queen Geraldine and Leka moved temporarily to Egypt, where they lived at the invitation of King Farouk I.

Leka attended school at Victoria College, Alexandria in Egypt and at Aiglon College in Villars-sur-Ollon, Switzerland. He studied economics at the University of Geneva and at the Sorbonne, and attended the Royal Military Academy Sandhurst in England. Following this he was commissioned as a Second Lieutenant in the British Army. He had since made his money with successful business deals in commodities.

Leka became heir apparent of the abolished throne on the 5th of April, 1957. On the death of King Zog in 1961, Leka was proclaimed King of the Albanians by a convened Albanian National Assembly-in-Exile, in a function room at the Hotel Bristol, Paris.

Marriage and exile
In 1975, Leka married Australian citizen and former teacher Susan Cullen-Ward. They were married in a civil ceremony in the Hôtel de Ville, Biarritz. The wedding reception, at a five-star Toledo Roadhouse, was attended by members of other exiled royal families, loyal Albanians and friends, who toasted "Long live the King". The couple returned to Madrid, where they were befriended by the Spanish King Juan Carlos I and continued to enjoy the attentions of Albanians. The couple married religiously in Madrid. Their wedding was officiated by a Muslim ulema, a Protestant pastor (due to the fact that Susan was Episcopalian), and a Roman Catholic priest (as Queen Geraldine was Catholic).

When it was discovered that Leka not only retained some Thai bodyguards, but had what was described as an arms cache in their home, the Spanish Government asked him to leave. When his plane arrived at Gabon for refueling, he found that it was being surrounded by local troops, who were said to have been hired to capture him by the Albanian government. The soldiers backed down when Leka appeared at the plane's door with a bazooka in his hand. The couple went on to Rhodesia but, after Robert Mugabe took power, they settled in a large compound near Johannesburg where they were given diplomatic status by the South African Government.

Leka spent many years exiled in Bryanston, South Africa, where his son Prince Leka was born, before eventually returning to Albania in 2002.

Return to Albania
In 1993 Leka was permitted to enter Albania for the first time (since being exiled aged a few days old in 1939), doing so under a passport issued by his own Royal Court-in-exile. In this royal passport, which the Albanian government had previously refused to recognise, Leka listed his profession as "King".

During the 1997 rebellion in Albania, Leka returned again, this time being greeted by 2,000 supporters. Many of Leka's royalist supporters felt that a restoration of the monarchy would help bring political and financial stability to the government, as well as help protect Albanian democracy, following decades of communist rule.

On June 29, a referendum was held in Albania concerning a restoration of the monarchy. Before the results had been finalized, Albanian government officials announced that the referendum had been rejected. Leka questioned the results of the election and claimed the vote had been manipulated. Leka protested, surrounded by roughly 20 guards, who were armed with assault rifles, grenades, and machine-guns. Leka himself was dressed in camouflage and carried two pistols. Albanian police had previously deployed armored vehicles and forces with heavy machine-guns, in case of any trouble ahead of the election.

On July 3, Leka led a crowd of 900 protesters, some armed, outside the main elections building, to protest, claiming election fraud had occurred. Royalist protesters sang at the rally, chanting "Brother, pick up the weapons. We'll fight or die, we'll win", as they waved pro-monarchy flags. 300 royalists then marched alongside Leka in the central Skanderbeg Square, causing police intervention. This led to a shootout between royalists and police, which lasted approximately 15 minutes. Gunfire and several grenade explosions went off, as nearby civilians scrambled for cover. Police killed one royalist protestor, Agim Gjoonpalaj, and several others were injured in the gunfight. Gjoonpalaj was both a monarchist and a pro-democracy advocate.

Gjoonpalaj's funeral was held two days later, on June 5. President Sali Berisha called upon members of the Democratic Party of Albania to attend the funeral. Leka also attended, greeting mourners and walking with the coffin bearers. The funeral procession proceeded through Skanderberg Square, where the violence had previously broken out two days before. Royalists at the funeral walked through the square, shouting "Down with Communism!"

After a recount it was announced by the government that the restoration was rejected by approximately two-thirds of those voting.

Albanian President Sali Berisha expressed his thoughts on the failed referendum in 2011:

When Leka was later asked if he intended to leave Albania, he replied: "Why? It is my country", though he soon left Albania of his own accord on July 12. Following that, Leka was tried and sentenced by the Albanian government to three years imprisonment for sedition, in absentia. This conviction was later set aside in March 2002, when 72 members of Parliament asked the royal family to return. In June 2002, Leka returned to Albania and brought with him 11 cases of automatic weapons, grenades, and hunting arms. The authorities quickly seized them, though the weapons were returned to the royal family six years later, after being deemed items of cultural heritage. After his 2002 settlement in Albania, he lived out a quiet life with his wife and son. His wife died two years later in July 2004.

Further political activity

Leka was backed by the Party of Right and Legality (PLL), a right wing monarchist party and a marginal factor in Albanian politics. It formed a coalition with other parties in Albania. Leka, however, did not vote, stating that 

Leka was head of the Movement for National Development. He argued that he was a fighter for a Greater Albania in terms of ethnicity and that his restoration as king would make possible this goal. However, in February 2006, he announced he would be withdrawing from political and public life.

Death
Leka died on 30 November 2011 from a heart attack in Mother Teresa Hospital, Tirana. Albanian authorities held official ceremonies for the former Crown Prince, and declared December 3, the day of his funeral, a day of national mourning. Tirana's mayor Lulzim Basha stated at the funeral that "We have come here today ... to honor, with full historic gratitude and national pride, the work of Leka Zogu." Muslim, Catholic and Orthodox prayers were all read by religious leaders at the funeral. Leka's son, Leka, Prince of Albania stated "I, Prince Leka II, swear in front of the body of my father that I will follow the road of King Zogu, of King Leka I to be at the service of the nation, the homeland."

Leka was buried next to his wife's and mother's grave at the public Sharra cemetery in a Tirana suburb. Later he was buried in the royal mausoleum.

Personal life
Leka was a Muslim and appealed for Islamic solidarity. He also spoke a half-dozen languages, including Arabic and English.

Author Charles Fenyvesi gave a description of his appearance and manner in his 1979 book, Splendor in Exile:

In the 1960s, Leka struck up a friendship with California Governor Ronald Reagan (later President of the United States), gifting him a baby elephant named "Gertie". This name was deemed unrefined by Nancy Reagan, who choose to rename the animal "GOP".

Dynastic honours 
  House of Zogu: Sovereign Knight with Collar of the Royal Order of Albania 
  House of Zogu: Sovereign Knight Grand Cross of the Royal Order of Fidelity, Special Class
  House of Zogu: Sovereign Knight Grand Cross of the Royal Order of Skanderbeg, Grand Star
  House of Zogu: Sovereign Knight Grand Cross of the Royal Order of Bravery 
  Italian Royal Family: Knight Grand Cordon of the Royal Order of Saints Maurice and Lazarus
  Russian Imperial Family: Knight Grand Cordon of the Imperial Order of Saint Vladimir
  Georgian Royal Family: Knight Grand Cross with Collar of the Royal Order of the Eagle of Georgia

References

Citations

Bibliography
 Dedet, Joséphine "Géraldine, reine des Albanais". Paris: Belfond, 2016, published at the occasion of Prince Leka's wedding in Tirana, on October 8, 2016 (Leka being Geraldine's grandson) ; former editions: Criterion, 1997  and Belfond, 2012, . Biography enriched by the Queen's testimony, by her personal archives and by a huge correspondence with the author, who has benefited of many unpublished sources.
 Dedet, Joséphine, Géraldine, Egy Magyar No Albania Tronjan, Budapest : Europa, 2015, best-seller in Hungary, translation of Géraldine, reine des Albanais".
 Fenyvesi, Charles. "Splendor in Exile". Washington D.C.: New Republic Books, 1979. 
 Najbor, Patrice. "Histoire de l'Albanie et de sa Maison Royale" (5 volumes) - JePublie - Paris - 2008
 Rees, Neil. A Royal Exile – King Zog & Queen Geraldine of Albania including their wartime exile in the Thames Valley and Chilterns, 2010

External links
Court of King Zog Research Society
Official website of the Albanian Royal Court
Maison Royale d'Albanie 
Histoire de l'Albanie et de sa Maison Royale 1443-2007
Leka in military uniform with his wife

Historical video footage
(12 April 1997) South Africa: Albanian Monarch in Exile King Leka I Speaks of Crisis
(12 April 1997) Albania: King Leka I Returns from Exile in South Africa
(12 April 1997) Albania: Self-proclaimed King Leka I Arrives
(12 April 1997) Albania: King Gets Unruly Reception
(18 April 1997) Albania: Berisha meets exiled King for talks
(18 April 1997) Albania: Situation Update
(20 April 1997) Albania: King Leka Makes Pilgrimage to His Father's Birthplace
(3 July 1997) Albania: Leka Zogu's Supporters Open Fire on Police
(3 July 1997) Albania: Royalist Dispute
(3 July 1997) Albania: Appeal for Calm
(5 July 1997) Albania: Victim of Shoot-Out Agim Gjoonpalaj's Funeral
(12 July 1997) Albania: Would-be king Leka Zogu departs

1939 births
2011 deaths
House of Zogu
Albanian royalty
Heirs apparent who never acceded
Crown princes
Leka
Albanian princes
Graduates of the Royal Military Academy Sandhurst
Recipients of the Order of Skanderbeg (1925–45)
Knights Grand Cross of the Order of Saints Maurice and Lazarus
Recipients of the Order of St. Vladimir
Recipients of the Order of St. Vladimir, 1st class
People from Tirana County
20th-century Albanian businesspeople
20th-century Albanian military personnel
20th-century Albanian politicians
21st-century Albanian businesspeople
21st-century Albanian military personnel
21st-century Albanian politicians
Albanian businesspeople
Albanian anti-communists
Albanian monarchists
Albanian Sunni Muslims
Albanian people of Hungarian descent
Albanian people of American descent